Hanna Panna Wiesner (born 29 December 2004) is a Hungarian rhythmic gymnast. She represents her country in international competitions.

Career 
Wiesner debuted at the World Cup in Sofia, being 37th in the All-Around, 39th with hoop, 30th with ball, 47th with clubs and 30th with ribbon. In April she competed in Tashkent taking 30th place in the All-Around, 37th with hoop, 26th with ball, 32nd with clubs and 28th with ribbon. A month later in Baku she was 39th in the All-Around, 41st with hoop, 38th with ball, 44th with clubs and 32nd with ribbon. In June Hanna participated in the European Championships in Varna, being 32nd in the All-Around, 29th with hoop, 27th with ball, 34th with clubs and 33rd with ribbon.

In 2022 she was again in Sofia for the World Cup, finishing 16th in the All-Around, 13th with hoop, 6th with ball, 22nd with clubs and 20th with ribbon. She then took part in the stage in Baku being 22nd in the All-Around, 27th with hoop, 20th with ball, 25th with clubs and 19th with ribbon. In May she competed in Pamplona ending 14th in the All-Around, 13th with hoop, 7th with ball, 13th with clubs and 20th with ribbon. During the World Cup in Portimão she was 8th in the All-Around, 10th with hoop, 7th with ball, 10th with clubs and 12th with ribbon. In June Wiesner was selected for the European Championships in Tel Aviv along the senior group and her idol Fanni Pigniczki, she was 9th in teams and took 18th place in the All-Around final. In September Hanna competed at the World Championships in Sofia, ending 27th in the All-Around, 27th with hoop, 41st with ball, 17th with clubs and 24th with ribbon.

Routine music information

References 

2004 births
Living people
Hungarian rhythmic gymnasts
Gymnasts from Budapest